National Library of Ivory Coast is located in Abidjan, Ivory Coast.

It was closed in 2006 because of lack of funding and a new team led by Adjiman Nandoh Chantal has been at work since February 2008 and aims to restore and renew the institution. As of October 2009, 85% of the building is still closed. The only available section is the Children's Department, which opened back in 2008 thanks to the Mitsubishi corporation (cost : 31.492.000 CFA Francs)

References 
National Library of Ivory Coast

Bibliography
  
  (Includes information about the national library)

Libraries in Ivory Coast
Organizations based in Abidjan
Buildings and structures in Abidjan
Ivory Coast